Webb-Barron-Wells House is a historic home located near Elm City, Wilson County, North Carolina.  It was probably built between about 1793 and 1820, and is a -story, double pile, frame coastal cottage with a hall-and-parlor plan.  It has a steeply pitched roofline and exterior end chimneys.  A kitchen wing was added about 1949.

It was listed on the National Register of Historic Places in 1986.

References

Houses on the National Register of Historic Places in North Carolina
Houses completed in 1820
Houses in Wilson County, North Carolina
National Register of Historic Places in Wilson County, North Carolina